K-1 PREMIUM 2004 Dynamite!! was an annual kickboxing and mixed martial arts event held by K-1 on New Year's Eve, Friday, December 31, 2004 at the Osaka Dome in Osaka, Japan. It featured 7 K-1 MMA rules fights, 3 K-1 rules fights, and a special mixed K-1 & MMA Rules fight.

The event attracted a sellout crowd of 52,918 to the Osaka Dome, and was broadcast across Japan on the TBS Network.

In the main event, Royce Gracie defeated Sumo legend Akebono in a K-1 MMA Rules match.

Results

Opening Fight #1, K-1 MMA Rules:
  The Predator vs.  Kristof Midoux
Predator defeated Midoux by Submission (Neck Crank) at 1:11 of the 1st round.

Opening Fight #2, K-1 MMA Rules:
  Cyril Abidi vs.  Bobby Ologun
Ologun defeated Abidi by Unanimous Decision (3-0).

Fight #1, K-1 MMA Rules:
  Yoshihiro Akiyama vs.  Francois Botha
Akiyama defeated Botha by Submission (Armbar) at 1:54 of the 1st round.

Fight #2, K-1 MMA Rules:
  Caol Uno vs.  Chandet Sorpantrey
Uno defeated Sorpantrey by Submission (Rear Naked Choke) at 0:19 of the 2nd round.

Fight #3, K-1 MMA Rules:
  Don Frye vs.  Yoshihiro Nakao
Nakao defeated Frye by Unanimous Decision (3-0).

Fight #4, K-1 Rules:
  Ray Sefo vs.  Gary Goodridge
Sefo defeated Goodridge by TKO (Referee Stoppage) at 0:24 of the 1st round.

Fight #5, K-1 Rules:
  Musashi vs.  Sean O'Haire
Musashi defeated O'Haire by KO at 0:44 of the 2nd round.

Fight #6, K-1 Rules:
  Masato vs.  Norifumi "KID" Yamamoto
Masato defeated Yamamoto by Unanimous Decision (3-0).

Fight #7, K-1 MMA Rules:
  Kazuyuki Fujita vs.  Karam Ibrahim
Fujita defeated Ibrahim by KO (Punch) at 1:07 of the 1st round.

Fight #8, Special Mixed Rules:
  Jerome Le Banner vs.  Bob Sapp
The fight was declared a draw. The rules for the fight stipulated that rounds 1 and 3 would be fought with K-1 rules, and rounds 2 and 4 would be fought under MMA rules. There were no judges for this fight.

Fight #9, K-1 MMA Rules:
  Akebono vs.  Royce Gracie
Gracie defeated Akebono by Submission (omoplata) at 2:13 of the 1st round.

See also
List of K-1 events
List of male kickboxers
PRIDE Shockwave 2004

References

External links
K-1 Official Website

K-1 events
2004 in kickboxing
2004 in mixed martial arts
Kickboxing in Japan
Mixed martial arts in Japan
Sport in Osaka